Hiram Sibley Homestead is a historic home located in the town of Mendon in Monroe County, New York. More specifically, the homestead is in the hamlet of Sibleyville, named in honor of Hiram Sibley.

History
The wood frame Federal-style house was built about 1827 and consists of five sections.  The original house includes the -story rectangular main section and the attached 2-story north and west wings. In 1928, the structure was moved from the roadside to a nearby bank of the Honeoye Creek.  It was built by Sibley and was the site of his initial business ventures in milling and manufacturing.

It was listed on the National Register of Historic Places in 1985.

Gallery

See also
 National Register of Historic Places listings in Monroe County, New York

References

External links

Houses on the National Register of Historic Places in New York (state)
Federal architecture in New York (state)
Houses completed in 1827
Houses in Monroe County, New York
National Register of Historic Places in Monroe County, New York
1827 establishments in New York (state)